The 2022–23 Kansas City Roos men's basketball team represented the University of Missouri–Kansas City in the 2022–23 NCAA Division I men's basketball season. The Roos, led by first-year head coach Marvin Menzies, played their home games at the Swinney Recreation Center in Kansas City, Missouri, as members of the Summit League.

Previous season
The Roos finished the 2021–22 season 19–12, 12–6 in Summit League play to finish in a tie for third place. In the Summit League tournament, they were defeated by South Dakota in the quarterfinals.

On April 21, the school announced that head coach Billy Donlon would be stepping down to "pursue other opportunities", ending his three-year tenure as the helm. Five days later, on April 26, Grand Canyon assistant coach Marvin Menzies was named the Roos' next head coach.

Roster

Schedule and results

|-
!colspan=12 style=""| Exhibition

|-
!colspan=12 style=""| Non-conference regular season

|-
!colspan=12 style=""| Summit League regular season

|-
!colspan=9 style=""|Summit League tournament

Sources

References

Kansas City Roos men's basketball seasons
Kansas City Roos
Kansas City Roos men's basketball
Kansas City Roos men's basketball